Mahyar Rural District is a rural district (dehestan) in the Central District of Qaen County, South Khorasan Province, Iran. At the 2006 census, its population was 4,874, in 1,150 families.  The rural district has 19 villages.

References 

Rural Districts of South Khorasan Province
Qaen County